Aspidimorpha quadrimaculata is a species of beetles belonging to the Chrysomelidae family. This species can be found in East Africa.

References
 Zipcodezoo Species Identifier
 
 Name Bank

Cassidinae
Beetles of Africa